Bcepmuvirus is a genus of viruses in the family Myoviridae, not assigned to a subfamily. Bacteria serve as the natural host, with transmission achieved through passive diffusion. There are two species in this genus.

Taxonomy
The following two species are assigned to the genus:
 Burkholderia virus BcepMu
 Burkholderia virus phiE255

Structure
Bcepmuviruses are nonenveloped, with a head and tail. The head has an elongated icosahedral symmetry (T=13, Q=21).

Genome
Both species have been fully sequenced and are available from ICTV. They range between 36k and 38k nucleotides, with 53 to 55 proteins. The complete genomes are available from here.

Life cycle
The virus attaches to the host cell using its terminal fibers, and ejects the viral DNA into the host cytoplasm via contraction of its tail sheath. Once the viral genes have been replicated, the procapsid is assembled and packed. The tail is then assembled and the mature virions are released via lysis.

History
According to the ICTV's 2010–11 report, the genus Bcepmuvirus was first accepted as a new genus, at the same time as both of its contained species. This proposal is available here.

References

Myoviridae
Virus genera